Ladiz Central District is a central district (bakhsh) in the Ladiz District of Mirjaveh County, in Sistan and Baluchestan Province, Iran. At the 2006 census, its population was 23,953, in 4,436 families.  The Ladiz district has 197 villages, including Alnajan-e Do and Khazpari.

References 

Rural Districts of Sistan and Baluchestan Province
Mirjaveh County